HC Benátky nad Jizerou is an ice hockey team in Benátky nad Jizerou, Czech Republic. They play in the Czech 2. Liga, the third level of ice hockey in the country. The club was founded in 1934.

Team names
 1934 - HC Sokol Benátky nad Jizerou
 1938 - SK Benátky nad Jizerou
 1948 - HC Spartak Benátky nad Jizerou
 1970 - HC Benátky nad Jizerou

Ice hockey teams in the Czech Republic
Ice hockey clubs established in 1934
Benátky nad Jizerou